Mikael Burakovsky (born June 23, 1977) is a Swedish former professional ice hockey player who played 16 seasons as a professional, including 111 games in the top Swedish league Elitserien between 1995 and 1997.

Personal life
Burakovsky's father, Benny, (who died on December 14, 2007, at the age of 64) was a hockey coach. Mikael's brother Robert was also a professional hockey player, and Mikael's nephew, André, was a top-rated prospect who was selected by the Washington Capitals in the first round (23rd overall) of the 2013 NHL Entry Draft and currently plays for the Colorado Avalanche.

References

External links

1977 births
Living people
Malmö Redhawks players
Jewish ice hockey players
Swedish ice hockey right wingers
Swedish people of Russian descent
Swedish people of Russian-Jewish descent
VIK Västerås HK players
Sportspeople from Malmö